Frank Allen may refer to:
Frank Allen (baseball) (1888–1933), baseball player
Frank Allen (bassist) (born 1943), English bass guitarist
Frank Allen (Australian footballer) (1926–2018), Australian rules footballer
Frank Allen (footballer, born 1901) (1901–1989), English footballer
Frank Allen (footballer, born 1927) (1927–2014), English footballer
Frank Allen (physicist) (1874–1965), Canadian physicist
Frank Allen (politician) (1882–1948), Australian politician
Frank Augustus Allen (1835–1916), Massachusetts politician
Frank D. Allen (1850–1910), American attorney and politician in Massachusetts
Frank G. Allen (1874–1950), Governor of Massachusetts
Frank Gates Allen (1858–1940), American football player and businessman
Frank M. Allen (1923–1999), Pennsylvania politician
Bunny Allen (Frank Maurice Allen, 1906–2002), white hunter
Frank Shaver Allen (1860–1934), Joliet, Illinois-based architect
Frank Allen (chemist) (1944–2014), crystallographer

See also
Francis Allen (disambiguation)
Frank Allan (1849–1917), Australian cricketer
Frank Allan (bishop) (born 1935), bishop of Atlanta
Allen (surname)